This is a list of recipients of the St Peter's Medal, the highest award of the British Association of Urological Surgeons (BAUS).

1949-1959

1960-1969

1970-1979

1980-1989

1990-1999

2000-2009

2010-2020

2021-2023

References

Urology
Medicine awards
Recipients of the St Peter's Medal